Micropterix herminiella is a species of moth belonging to the family Micropterigidae. It was described by Corley in 2007. It is only known from northern Portugal.

References

Micropterigidae
Moths described in 2007